Alan Curtis Bates (March 17, 1945 – August 5, 2016) was an American osteopathic physician and a Democratic politician from the U.S. state of Oregon.  He was a member of the Oregon State Senate, representing the 3rd District since 2005. Previously he was a member of the Oregon House of Representatives from 2000 through 2004.

Biography
Alan C. Bates was born March 17, 1945. Bates graduated with a bachelor's degree from Central Washington University. Bates served in the United States Army from 1965 to 1967. In 1977, he graduated from Kansas City University with a Doctor of Osteopathic Medicine degree. From 2000 to 2004, Bates served in the Oregon House of Representatives. From 2005 to 2016, Bates served in the Oregon State Senate. Bates was instrumental in implementing the Oregon Health Plan, a statewide insurance plan designed to cover low-income residents during the first tenure of Governor John Kitzhaber.

Bates died of a myocardial infarction (heart attack) on August 5, 2016, while fly fishing with his son on the Rogue River.

See also
 78th Oregon Legislative Assembly
 77th Oregon Legislative Assembly
 76th Oregon Legislative Assembly
 75th Oregon Legislative Assembly
 74th Oregon Legislative Assembly
 73rd Oregon Legislative Assembly

References

External links
 Oregon State Senate - Alan Bates official government website
 Oregon Senate Democrats - Alan Bates senate Democrats legislative website
 Follow the Money - Alan Bates
 2006 2004  2002 2000 campaign contributions
 Dr. Elizabeth Steiner Hayward and Dr. Alan Bates testify before Oregon Medical Board -- OMB Public Meeting audio from 2012-10-12

1945 births
2016 deaths
Democratic Party Oregon state senators
Democratic Party members of the Oregon House of Representatives
Physicians from Oregon
American osteopathic physicians
Politicians from Seattle
Politicians from Ashland, Oregon
Kansas City University of Medicine and Biosciences alumni
21st-century American politicians